James P. Conway (October 8, 1858 – December 21, 1912) was an American Major League Baseball player who pitched for the Brooklyn Atlantics, Philadelphia Athletics and Kansas City Cowboys, over the course of three seasons – and .  His brother Pete Conway, was a major league pitcher as well, most notably for the Detroit Wolverines.

References

External links

1858 births
1912 deaths
Major League Baseball pitchers
Baseball players from Pennsylvania
19th-century baseball players
Brooklyn Atlantics (AA) players
Philadelphia Athletics (AA) players
Kansas City Cowboys players
Lowell (minor league baseball) players
Pittsburgh Allegheny players
Atlanta Atlantas players
Topeka Golden Giants players
Kansas City Blues (baseball) players
Buffalo Bisons (minor league) players
Kingston Patriarchs players
Kingston Colonels players